Marc-André Bergeron (born 22 July 1991) is a Canadian taekwondo practitioner. In 2015, he was named to be in Canada's team at the 2015 Pan American Games, which were held in Toronto. He won a gold medal at the 2013 Dutch Open and a gold medal at the 2014 Pan American Championships.

References

1991 births
Living people
Taekwondo practitioners at the 2015 Pan American Games
Canadian male taekwondo practitioners
Pan American Games medalists in taekwondo
Pan American Games bronze medalists for Canada
Medalists at the 2015 Pan American Games
21st-century Canadian people